San Sebastián del Oeste is a town and municipality, located on the western part of Jalisco state, Mexico, between 20°39’45’’ - 21°02’30’’ N and 104°35’00’’ - 104°51’00’’ W, at a height of 1,480 metres (4,856 ft).

Geography
The municipality of San Sebastián del Oeste borders the state of Nayarit to the north; to the south, the municipality of Mascota; to the east, the municipalities of Guachinango and Mascota; and to the west, Puerto Vallarta.

The city and municipality are served by an airfield.

History
San Sebastián was founded as a mining town in 1605, during the early Spanish colonial Viceroyalty of New Spain period. Gold, silver and lead were mined in the area. More than 25 mines and a number of foundries were established by 1785.

The town was formally established as a city in 1812.

Population
At the start of the 21st century, San Sebastián city has a population of less than 1,000 people.

It reached a peak population of around 20,000 people by 1900. The prosperity of the city declined after the revolution of 1910.

Features
San Sebastián del Oeste is a designated Pueblo Mágico, one of the towns maintaining their historical character and promoted by the federal government as tourism destinations. It also receives tourists visiting nearby Puerto Vallarta on the coast to the west. Recent road improvements reduced transit time from Puerto Vallarta to under 2 hours.
The Church of Saint Sebastian, whose original construction was in 1608, was designed in the Colonial Spanish Baroque style. It has notable architectural details, including Corinthian columns and ceiling vault frescos.
Many structures in the city and municipality were built of cut stone and/or adobe in the 19th and earlier centuries, and remain unchanged. Some old haciendas in the municipality have been purchased and restored in recent decades.
The city is on the Tentative List

Fiestas
The town is known for its fiestas for religious holidays:
 January 20 — a fiesta in honor of Saint Sebastian.
 August 15 — a fiesta dedicated to the Virgin of the Asunción.
 October 7 — a fiesta for the Virgin of the Rosary.
 December 12 —  the Virgin of Guadalupe is venerated at the small town of Los Reyes, near San Sebastian del Oeste city in the municipality. The Fiesta of Guadalupe occurs throughout Mexico on this date.

Government 
Its form of government is democratic and depends on the state and federal government; elections are held every three years, when the municipal president and her/his council are elected.  The municipal president is Aurora Ponce Peña, from the Citizens' Movement party, who was elected in the elections on 6 June 2021.

Municipal presidents

Images

References

External links
 Encyclopedia of Mexican Municipalities (Spanish)
 Blog - San Sebastián del Oeste
—San Sebastián del Oeste: "Un Pueblos Mágicos" (Spanish).
World Heritage Sites, Tentative list — submission document

Municipalities of Jalisco
Mining communities in Mexico
Pueblos Mágicos
Populated places established in 1605
1605 establishments in New Spain
World Heritage Tentative List for Mexico